Caroline Schneider (born 1 June 1973) is a German professional tennis player. During her career, she won several titles on the ITF Women's Circuit.

Career highlights

On 25 April 1994, Schneider reached her highest doubles ranking: World Number 61. Her highest singles ranking came on 12 December 1994, when she became World Number 289. In her career, she won $US 256,449.

Grand Slam Doubles

From 1988 to 2002, Schneider competed in twenty Grand Slam doubles tournaments, but never advanced beyond the second round. She competed six times at the Australian Open, nine times at the French Open, four times at Wimbledon and once at the US Open.

ITF Women's Doubles

In July 1996, with her partner Kirstin Freye, she won the $25,000 Buenos Aires. In 1997, she won the $10,000 Salzburg with Austria's Patricia Wartusch; and the $25,000 Kyiv with Sweden's Annica Lindstedt. In April 2006, she partnered with Italy's Romina Oprandi to win the $25,000 Bari.

ITF Seniors Circuit

Schneider is a participant in the ITF Seniors Circuit. She reached her highest W40 singles ranking (27) on 1 June 2010 and her highest W40 doubles ranking (132) on 30 May 2016.

WTA Tour finals

Doubles finals

ITF Circuit finals

Singles

Doubles

References

External links
 
 

Living people
1973 births
German female tennis players
West German female tennis players
Tennis players from Munich